The Wisconsin Valley Conference is a high school athletic conference composed of the largest public schools in north-central Wisconsin centered on the Wausau, Wisconsin metro area. The Wisconsin Valley is one of Wisconsin's oldest athletic conferences.  The conference sponsors a variety of high school sports for girls and boys.  In 2008, Antigo and Merrill, which had been charter members for 87 years, moved to the Great Northern Conference.  This was the first change of the Wisconsin Valley Conference since 1980 when member Shawano moved to the Bay Conference. In the summer of 2010 Merrill returned to the Wisconsin Valley Conference and Rhinelander  moved to the Great Northern Conference. In 2010 The WVC Schools petitioned to the WIAA for scheduling assistance in Football. Therefore, a football only conference was formed made up of Fox Valley Association schools named the Valley Football Association. Due to the Valley Football Association subsequently having 16 teams and the inability to have all teams play one another, the conference was forced to split into two divisions: North & South.

Member schools 
Current members of the Wisconsin Valley are:
 D.C. Everest Evergreens, Schofield 
 Marshfield Tigers, Marshfield
 Merrill Blue Jays, Merrill
 Stevens Point Panthers, Stevens Point
 Wausau East Lumberjacks, Wausau
 Wausau West Warriors, Wausau
 Wisconsin Rapids Red Raiders, Wisconsin Rapids

Merrill left in 2008 & joined back in 2010.

Former member schools:
 Antigo Red Robins (Left 2008), Antigo
 Rhinelander Hodags (Left 2010)Rhinelander
 Shawano Hawks (Left 1980), Shawano
 Medford Raiders (Left 1920s/30s), Medford
 Nekoosa Papermakers (Left 1920s/30s), Nekoosa
 Tomahawk Hatchets (Left 1920s/1930s), Tomahawk, Wisconsin

Wisconsin Valley football and wrestling 

Since the Wisconsin Interscholastic Athletic Association began the state football playoffs in 1976, the Wisconsin Valley has had a team in the state championship 17 times, and won the championship 11 times (including 5 title wins by the D.C. Everest Evergreens), more than any other large school conference.

Wisconsin Valley Conference football rivalries 
Rivalries in the conference include Marshfield and D.C. Everest, Wausau East and Wausau West, and Stevens Point and Wisconsin Rapids

External links 
Wisconsin Valley Conference

Wisconsin high school sports conferences
High school sports conferences and leagues in the United States